PBF or Pbf may refer to:

Organizations
 PBF Energy, a petroleum refiner and supplier
 Pittsburgh Bureau of Fire, provides of fire protection to the city of Pittsburgh, Pennsylvania
 Public Benefit Flying organizations, volunteer pilot groups under the auspices of the Air Care Alliance

Sports
 Pakistan Badminton Federation, the governing body for the sport of badminton in Pakistan
 Pakistan Boxing Federation, the governing body of amateur boxing in Pakistan
 Pakistan Bridge Federation, the sport governing body for the game of Bridge in Pakistan
 Palestinian Basketball Federation, the governing body of basketball in Palestine
 Paraguayan Basketball Federation, the governing body of basketball in Paraguay
 Philippine Bowling Federation, a duly-accredited governing body of Tenpin Bowling in the Philippines

Other
 Bolsa Floresta (PBF), a program to encourage conservation of forests through sustainable use
 Grider Field (IATA code: PBF), a public airport five miles southeast of Pine Bluff, in Jefferson County, Arkansas
 The Perry Bible Fellowship, a newspaper comic strip and webcomic by Nicholas Gurewitch
 Personenbahnhof (Pbf), a type of German rail station 
 PTTG1IP (also PTTG1-binding factor), a poorly characterised protein that in humans is encoded by the PTTG1IP gene
 United Nations Peacebuilding Fund, a multi-year standing trust fund for post-conflict peacebuilding
 Protocol Buffer Binary Format (PBF), a binary file format used to store structured data